Kurrama is an Australian Aboriginal language. It is a dialect of Yindjibarndi, one of the Ngayarda languages of the large Pama–Nyungan family, with almost identical vocabulary and grammar, but speakers consider it to be a distinct language.

The language name has also previously been written as: Kurama, Gurrama, Gurama (amongst others). While there is no official orthography for Kurrama the Wangka Maya Pilbara Aboriginal Language Centre uses the spelling "Kurrama" in all its publications.

A number of linguists have carried out work on Kurrama however there is not yet a comprehensive grammatical description of the language. The Pilbara Aboriginal Language Centre has an ongoing program of documentation of Pilbara languages, including Kurrama.

The Kurrama people associated with the language are an indigenous Australian group whose traditional lands are centred on the higher plateau regions of the Hamersley Ranges.

References

External links
Kurrama from on-line version of the 'Handbook of Western Aboriginal Languages South of the Kimberley'

Ngayarda languages
Endangered indigenous Australian languages in Western Australia